The 1982 WFA Cup Final was the 12th final of the WFA Cup, England's primary cup competition for women's football teams. The showpiece event was played under the auspices of the Women's Football Association (WFA). Lowestoft Ladies F.C. and Cleveland Spartans contested the match at Loftus Road in London on 1 May 1982. Lowestoft Ladies F.C. won 2-0.

Match

Lowestoft Ladies F.C. won 2-0.

Summary

References

External links
 
 Report at WomensFACup.co.uk

Cup
Women's FA Cup finals
WFA Cup Final
1982 sports events in London